Patrick Oliver Farrelly (11 July 1935 – 24 October 2018) was a Canadian racewalker. He competed in the men's 20 kilometres walk at the 1976 Summer Olympics. He died in 2018 after a long illness.

References

1935 births
2018 deaths
Athletes (track and field) at the 1976 Summer Olympics
Canadian male racewalkers
Olympic track and field athletes of Canada
Irish emigrants to Canada
Sportspeople from County Westmeath